

Seeds

Results

Section 1

Section 2

Section 3

Section 4

Finals

References
tournamentsoftware.com

- Mixed doubles, 2006 Ibf World Championships
World Championships